Asia Pacific Rayon (APR) is one of the largest viscose-rayon producers in Asia, with annual capacity of 300,000 tons of viscose-rayon. The company is based in Pangkalan Kerinci, Riau, Indonesia. The company produces renewable and biodegradable viscose-rayon, which is made from wood cellulose, and serves as an alternative to fossil-based synthetics in the textile industry. It is one of Royal Golden Eagle's business groups.

Business 
APR is the largest integrated rayon factory in Indonesia. Most of its supply come from pulp and paper producer APRIL. It claims its "from plantation to fashion" integrated value chain supports the nation's "Making Indonesia 4.0" economic roadmap, which aims to boost competitiveness in, among many, five priority sectors: Food and drinks, automotive, textile, electronics, and chemicals.

The company produces viscose-rayon, commonly used in textile products. 
APR's products are exported to 14 countries including Brazil Turkey, Pakistan, Sri Lanka, Bangladesh various parts of Europe.

In a collaboration with the International Chamber of Commerce and Singapore-based blockchain startup Perlin Net Group, APR on 9 April 2019 launched 'Follow Our Fibre', a blockchain project on viscose supply chain traceability.

References

External links 
 Official Website

Textile companies of Indonesia
Indonesian brands